Don Camillo Carlo Luigi dei Principi Ruspoli (16 January 1865 in Florence – 7 November 1944 in Florence) was an Italian and Spanish aristocrat, son of Luigi Ruspoli y Godoy, 3rd Marquis of Boadilla del Monte and second wife Donna Emilia, Nobile Landi.

He was 4th Marqués de Boadilla del Monte with a Coat of Arms of Ruspoli (Letter of 28 March 1894) and Prince of the Holy Roman Empire.

Marriage and children 
On 7 October 1897, in Florence, he married Emilia dei Conti Orlandini del Beccuto (18 April 1873 in Florence – ?), by whom he had two sons: 
 Don Luigi Francesco Maria dei Principi Ruspoli (31 August 1898 in Montughi, Florence – 6 November 1944 in Florence), unmarried and without issue
 Paolo Ruspoli, 5th Marquis of Boadilla del Monte

Additional information

See also 
 Ruspoli

Sources 

 
 
 

1865 births
1944 deaths
Camillo
Marquesses of Boadilla del Monte